Rudy Carlton Gay Jr. (born August 17, 1986) is an American professional basketball player for the Utah Jazz of the National Basketball Association (NBA). The 6'8" forward played college basketball for the University of Connecticut before being drafted eighth overall in the 2006 NBA draft by the Houston Rockets; he was traded to the Memphis Grizzlies days later.

Early life and high school
Born in Brooklyn, New York, to Rae Gay and Rudy Gay Sr., former lead singer of the R&B group Ace Spectrum and band director for The Stylistics, Gay began playing competitive recreational basketball at the age of 12 in his hometown of Baltimore, Maryland. At the age of 14, Gay began playing for the nationally known Cecil-Kirk AAU program under coach Anthony Lewis.

Gay played his first two years of high school basketball at Baltimore County's Eastern Technical High School, a magnet school in Essex. He played varsity basketball both years. In his sophomore season at Eastern Tech, the Mavericks earned their first and only trip to College Park for the state semi-finals. Although Eastern Tech was a Blue Ribbon academic institution, Gay's parents were concerned about his college preparation. He began his junior year with Eastern Tech, but in September 2002, he transferred to Archbishop Spalding in Severn. This prompted the Maryland Interscholastic Athletic Association to review its transfer rules. He began playing basketball for Spalding as a junior in 2002–03, earning first-team All-Baltimore Catholic League honors as a junior and senior, and was also honored as the Baltimore Sun's co-player of the year as a senior. He was the Washington Post All-Met Basketball Player of the Year, a McDonald's All-American, and a Parade first-team All-American in his senior year after averaging 21.2 points, 9.2 rebounds and 3.7 blocks per game. Considered a five-star recruit by Rivals.com, Gay was listed as the No. 2 small forward and the No. 5 player in the nation in 2004.

College recruitment
Gay's college recruitment and decision to attend the University of Connecticut over the University of Maryland were controversial. Gay had expressed a desire to attend Maryland and said that he grew up rooting for the team, but he ultimately chose UConn. Because of the heavy involvement of an AAU coach and a high school coach, there was the appearance of impropriety, although no NCAA recruiting violations were discovered. The NCAA adopted a new scheduling rule after UConn paid $25,000 to schedule a game against the Beltway Ballers, an ad hoc AAU team that consisted of Gay's former teammates. Although it violated no standing rule at the time, media observers and Connecticut staff considered it directly connected to the recruitment. According to individuals close to Maryland head coach Gary Williams, the recruitment demonstrated that rule-bending is often necessary to secure highly touted players, which Williams said he was unwilling to do, even at the expense of recruiting.

College career

As a freshman at Connecticut in 2004–05, Gay was a co-winner (with Jeff Green of Georgetown) of the Big East Conference Rookie of the Year award after averaging 11.8 points, 5.4 rebounds and 1.5 assists on .462 shooting in 28.8 minutes in 31 games. He was a unanimous Big East All-Rookie Team selection, was named National Freshman of the Year by The Sporting News, and earned Big East Rookie of the Week honors five times.

In the summer of 2005, Gay played for United States' Men's Under-21 World Championship Team. He averaged 10.5 points and 5.5 rebounds per game over the tournament.

Before his sophomore season began, Gay was nominated as Big East Preseason Player of the Year, along with Syracuse guard Gerry McNamara. After the season concluded, Gay was one of four division one college players nominated for the Naismith College Player of the Year Award (along with JJ Redick, Adam Morrison and Allan Ray). Also, he was a unanimous selection to the First-team All-Big East. He led the Huskies in scoring (15.2 points) while averaging 6.4 rebounds, 2.1 assists, and 30.8 minutes in 33 games as a sophomore. He was named first-team All-America by the National Association of Basketball Coaches (NABC) and was named to the 2006 Washington, D.C. Regional All-Tournament Team. He scored a career-high 28 points on November 21, 2005, against Arkansas. Gay led the Huskies to a 30–3 record and finished his college career with 20 points and six rebounds in a career-high 42 minutes in an NCAA Elite Eight loss to George Mason on March 26.

On April 24, 2006, Gay declared for the 2006 NBA draft.

In February 2012, Gay was inducted into the "Huskies of Honor".

Professional career

Memphis Grizzlies (2006–2013)
Gay was selected with the eighth overall pick in the 2006 NBA draft by the Houston Rockets, who then traded him and Stromile Swift to the Memphis Grizzlies in exchange for Shane Battier on July 12. Gay immediately signed his rookie scale contract with the Grizzlies upon being acquired by the team. Gay averaged 10.8 points, 4.5 rebounds, and 27.0 minutes in 78 games (43 starts) as a rookie. He earned NBA Rookie of the Month honors for November 2006, and went on to be selected to the 2006–07 All-Rookie First Team after placing fourth among first-year players in scoring, sixth in rebounding, fifth in steals (0.91), third in blocks (0.95), and fourth in minutes. He also finished third in the balloting for the 2006–07 Rookie of the Year Award behind winner Brandon Roy and runner-up Andrea Bargnani.

In 2007–08, Gay's second season, he set a Grizzlies' franchise record for points in a single season (1,632) and established a career-high for scoring average (20.1 points), becoming just the third player in franchise history to average 20 points per game (behind only Shareef Abdur-Rahim and Pau Gasol). He participated in the 2008 Rising Stars Slam Dunk Contest, and finished runner-up to Hedo Türkoğlu for the 2007–08 NBA Most Improved Player Award. After his invitation to the 2008 Slam Dunk Contest, Gay and YouTube teamed up for the Rudy Gay Slam Dunk Contest promotion, in which he asked fans to upload footage of their best dunks for him to attempt during the contest. During the contest, he performed a one-handed reverse clutch dunk in the first round, and during the second round, teammate Kyle Lowry alley-ooped the ball off the bar and from behind the backboard; Gay regathered and pulled off a windmill dunk. He ended with a score of 85 but did not advance to the second round.

In 2008–09, Gay recorded 18.9 points, 5.5 rebounds, 1.24 steals and 37.3 minutes in 79 games (78 starts). He made a baseline jumper as time expired in Memphis' home opener on October 31 against the Orlando Magic, giving the organization its first home-opening win since the 2000–01 season.

On December 13, 2009, Gay scored a career-high 41 points against the Miami Heat, tying Mike Miller's franchise record for points in a win. In 2009–10, he ranked second on the team in scoring (19.6 points) in 39.7 minutes in 80 games (all starts). He finished the season tied for 18th in the NBA in scoring, 17th in steals and third in minutes.

On July 8, 2010, Gay re-signed with the Memphis Grizzlies to a five-year, $82 million contract. He emerged as one of the league's premier small forwards in 2010–11, posting career highs in seven major statistical categories before missing the final 23 regular-season games and all of the 2011 Playoffs due to a left shoulder subluxation sustained on February 15 against the Philadelphia 76ers. He recorded career highs for assists (2.8), steals (1.69), blocks (1.07), field goal percentage (.471), three-point field goal percentage (.396), free throw percentage (.805) and minutes (39.9). He also ranked second on the team in scoring (19.8 points) in 54 games (all starts). Gay watched from the sidelines as the Grizzlies defeated the top-seeded San Antonio Spurs in a first round upset before falling to the Oklahoma City Thunder in seven games in the Western Conference semi-finals.

Gay passed Shane Battier (523) as the Grizzlies' all-time leader in steals on February 2, 2012, against the Atlanta Hawks. In 2011–12, Gay led the Grizzlies in scoring (19.0 points) and minutes (37.3), and averaged a career-high in rebounding (6.4). He posted 2.3 assists and .455 shooting in 65 games (all starts) and ranked 17th in the NBA in scoring, 16th in steals (1.46), sixth in minutes, and seventh in dunks (110). He made his first postseason appearance in 2011–12, averaged a team-high 19.0 points, 6.6 rebounds and 1.4 assists on .421 shooting in 39.9 minutes in seven games against the Los Angeles Clippers in the first round of the 2012 Western Conference Playoffs.

Toronto Raptors (2013)

On January 30, 2013, the Grizzlies traded Gay to the Toronto Raptors in a three-team deal that also included the Detroit Pistons. Gay set a franchise record by scoring 74 points in his first three games with the Raptors. The Raptors finished the 2012–13 season with a 34–48 win–loss record and missed the playoffs. He became the first player to lead two teams in scoring in the same season since Stephon Marbury in 2003–04. He averaged 19.5 points, 6.4 rebounds, 1.73 steals and 34.7 minutes in 33 games (32 starts) with Toronto.

Sacramento Kings (2013–2017)
On December 9, 2013, the Raptors traded Gay, along with Quincy Acy and Aaron Gray, to the Sacramento Kings in exchange for Greivis Vásquez, John Salmons, Chuck Hayes and Patrick Patterson. On January 22, 2014, he tied his career high of 41 points in the Kings' 114–97 win over the New Orleans Pelicans.

On June 22, 2014, Gay exercised his $19.3 million contract option with the Kings for the 2014–15 season. On October 31, 2014, Gay scored 40 points in a 103–94 win over the Portland Trail Blazers. On November 19, 2014, he signed a three-year, $40 million contract extension with the Kings. Gay appeared in just one of the Kings' final nine games of the 2014–15 season after experiencing headaches due to a concussion he received when he had a collision with his ex-teammate, Marc Gasol of the Memphis Grizzlies, on March 30. Gay had one of his best seasons in the NBA, averaging 21.1 points, 5.9 rebounds and 3.7 assists in 68 games.

On November 25, 2015, Gay scored a season-high 36 points in a 129–118 win over the Milwaukee Bucks. On December 15, 2015, he recorded 17 points, 13 rebounds, 3 assists, 1 block, and a career-high 6 steals in a 107–97 win over the Houston Rockets.

On January 18, 2017, Gay sustained a full rupture of his left Achilles tendon in the Kings' 106–100 loss to the Indiana Pacers and subsequently missed the remainder of the season.

San Antonio Spurs (2017–2021)
On July 6, 2017, Gay signed with the San Antonio Spurs. On December 28, 2017, Gay suffered a right heel injury and was subsequently ruled out for at least two weeks.

On July 11, 2018, Gay re-signed with the Spurs.

Utah Jazz (2021–present)
On August 6, 2021, Gay signed with the Utah Jazz.

National team career
In 2010, Gay helped the United States win its first FIBA World Championship gold medal since 1994, averaging 7.0 points, 2.9 rebounds and 1.0 steals in 13.4 minutes in nine games for the undefeated Americans. He was also a member of the national team in 2014 that collected the gold medal at the FIBA Basketball World Cup after another undefeated campaign.

Career statistics

NBA

Regular season

|-
| style="text-align:left;"| 
| style="text-align:left;"| Memphis
| 78 || 43 || 27.0 || .422 || .364 || .727 || 4.5 || 1.3 || .9 || .9 || 10.8
|-
| style="text-align:left;"| 
| style="text-align:left;"| Memphis
| 81 || 81 || 37.0 || .461 || .346 || .785 || 6.2 || 2.0 || 1.4 || 1.0 || 20.1
|-
| style="text-align:left;"| 
| style="text-align:left;"| Memphis
| 79 || 78 || 37.3 || .453 || .351 || .767 || 5.5 || 1.7 || 1.2 || .7 || 18.9
|-
| style="text-align:left;"| 
| style="text-align:left;"| Memphis
| 80 || 80 || 39.7 || .466 || .327 || .752 || 5.9 || 1.9 || 1.5 || .8 || 19.6
|-
| style="text-align:left;"| 
| style="text-align:left;"| Memphis
| 54 || 54 || 39.9 || .471 || .396 || .805 || 6.2 || 2.8 || 1.7 || 1.1 || 19.8
|-
| style="text-align:left;"| 
| style="text-align:left;"| Memphis
| 65 || 65 || 37.3 || .455 || .312 || .791 || 6.4 || 2.3 || 1.5 || .8 || 19.0
|-
| style="text-align:left;"rowspan=2| 
| style="text-align:left;"| Memphis
| 42 || 42 || 36.7 || .408 || .310 || .776 || 5.9 || 2.6 || 1.3 || .7 || 17.2 
|-
| style="text-align:left;"| Toronto
| 33 || 32 || 34.7 || .425 || .336 || .856 || 6.4 || 2.8 || 1.7 || .7 || 19.5
|-
| style="text-align:left;"rowspan=2| 
| style="text-align:left;"| Toronto
| 18 || 18 || 35.5 || .388 || .373 || .773 || 7.4 || 2.2 || 1.6 || 1.3 || 19.4
|-
| style="text-align:left;"| Sacramento
| 55 || 55 || 34.4 || .482 || .312 || .836 || 5.5 || 3.1 || 1.2 || .6 || 20.1
|-
| style="text-align:left;"| 
| style="text-align:left;"| Sacramento
| 68 || 67 || 35.4 || .455 || .359 || .858 || 5.9 || 3.7 || 1.0 || .6 || 21.1
|-
| style="text-align:left;"| 
| style="text-align:left;"| Sacramento
| 70 || 70 || 34.0 || .463 || .344 || .780 || 6.5 || 1.7 || 1.4 || .7 || 17.2
|-
| style="text-align:left;"| 
| style="text-align:left;"| Sacramento
| 30 || 30 || 33.8 || .455 || .372 || .855 || 6.3 || 2.7 || 1.5 || .9 || 18.7
|-
| style="text-align:left;"| 
| style="text-align:left;"| San Antonio
| 57 || 6 || 21.6 || .471 || .314 || .772 || 5.1 || 1.3 || .8 || .7 || 11.5
|-
| style="text-align:left;"| 
| style="text-align:left;"| San Antonio
| 69 || 51 || 26.7 || .504 || .402 || .816 || 6.8 || 2.6 || .8 || .5 || 13.7
|-
| style="text-align:left;"| 
| style="text-align:left;"| San Antonio
| 67 || 5 || 21.8 || .466 || .336 || .882 || 5.4 || 1.7 || .5 || .5 || 10.8
|-
| style="text-align:left;"| 
| style="text-align:left;"| San Antonio
| 63 || 1 || 21.6 || .420 || .381 || .804 || 4.8 || 1.4 || .7 || .6 || 11.4
|-
| style="text-align:left;"| 
| style="text-align:left;"| Utah
| 55 || 1 || 18.9 || .414 || .345 || .785 || 4.4 || 1.0 || .5 || .3 || 8.1
|- class="sortbottom"
| style="text-align:center;" colspan="2"| Career
| 1064 || 779 || 31.7 || .453 || .349 || .799 || 5.8 || 2.1 || 1.1 || .7 || 16.3

Playoffs

|-
| style="text-align:left;"| 2012
| style="text-align:left;"| Memphis
| 7 || 7 || 39.9 || .421 || .211 || .825 || 6.6 || 1.4 || 1.3 || .3 || 19.0
|-
| style="text-align:left;"| 2018
| style="text-align:left;"| San Antonio
| 5 || 4 || 32.0 || .400 || .222 || .556 || 5.6 || 2.2 || 1.6 || .2 || 12.2
|-
| align="left" | 2019
| align="left" | San Antonio
| 7 || 0 || 25.6 || .400 || .421 || .824 || 7.1 || 1.7 || .4 || .7 || 11.1
|- class="sortbottom"
| style="text-align:center;" colspan="2"| Career
| 19 || 11 || 32.5 || .410 || .286 || .788 || 6.5 || 1.7 || 1.1 || .4 || 14.3

College statistics

|-
| style="text-align:left;"| 2004–05
| style="text-align:left;"| Connecticut
| 31 || 26 || 28.8 || .462 || .467 || .708 || 5.4 || 1.5 || .8 || 1.9 || 11.8
|-
| style="text-align:left;"| 2005–06
| style="text-align:left;"| Connecticut
| 33 || 33 || 30.8 || .461 || .318 || .732 || 6.4 || 2.1 || 1.8 || 1.6 || 15.2
|-
|- class="sortbottom"
| style="text-align:left;"| Career
| style="text-align:left;"|
| 64 || 59 || 29.8 || .461 || .378 || .721 || 5.9 || 1.8 || 1.3 || 1.7 || 13.6
|-

Personal life
In 2010, Gay was named an ambassador for the Hoops for St. Jude fundraising program for St. Jude Children's Research Hospital in Memphis and donated $20,000 to the program, which allowed donors to pledge a set amount of dollars for each point scored by Gay and other participating NBA players.

In April 2010, Gay was awarded the NBA Cares Community Assist Award for March in recognition of his service to the Memphis community, particularly his ongoing support of St. Jude Children's Research Hospital in Memphis. As a result, a $5,000 donation was given by the NBA on behalf of Gay to support St. Jude Children's Research Hospital. Gay, who wore number 22 with Memphis, personally donated $22,222 to the hospital.

In 2013, Gay married his longtime girlfriend Ecko Wray.

References

External links

 uconnhooplegends.com profile
 USA Basketball profile

1986 births
Living people
21st-century African-American sportspeople
2010 FIBA World Championship players
2014 FIBA Basketball World Cup players
African-American basketball players
All-American college men's basketball players
American expatriate basketball people in Canada
American men's basketball players
Basketball players from Baltimore
FIBA Basketball World Cup-winning players
FIBA World Championship-winning players
Houston Rockets draft picks
McDonald's High School All-Americans
Memphis Grizzlies players
Parade High School All-Americans (boys' basketball)
People from Dundalk, Maryland
People from Severn, Maryland
Sacramento Kings players
San Antonio Spurs players
Small forwards
Sportspeople from Anne Arundel County, Maryland
Sportspeople from Baltimore County, Maryland
Toronto Raptors players
UConn Huskies men's basketball players
United States men's national basketball team players
Utah Jazz players